The tables below include tabular lists for selected basic foods, compiled from United States Dept. of Agriculture (USDA) sources. Included for each food is its weight in grams, its calories, and (also in grams,) the amount of protein, carbohydrates, dietary fiber, fat, and saturated fat. As foods vary by brands and stores, the figures should only be considered estimates, with more exact figures often included on product labels. For precise details about vitamins and mineral contents, the USDA source can be used.

To use the tables, click on "show" or "hide" at the far right for each food category. In the Measure column, "t" = teaspoon and "T" = tablespoon. In the food nutrient columns, the letter "t" indicates that only a trace amount is available.

Dairy products

Oils, fats and shortenings

Meat and poultry

Fish and seafood

Vegetables

Fruits

Breads, cereals and grains

Soups: canned and diluted

Desserts and sweets

Nuts and seeds

Beverages

See also

 Food energy
 Food groups
 Nutrient contents of common foods
 Food labels
 Healthy diet
 Nutrition
 Human nutrition

References

Nutrition